Satish Acharya is an Indian cartoonist from Kundapura, Karnataka. In 2015, Acharya was featured on "United Sketches" as a professional cartoon from India. Acharya was also included in the list of "24 Intellectuals" by Forbes India, in 2015.

Early life and education
Acharya is a self-taught cartoonist without any formal training in art. As a student, he earned pocket-money by contributing cartoons to Kannada publications like Taranga, Sudha and Tushara.  He studied MBA in finance from Mangalore University after doing  BCom from Bhandarkar’s College, Kundapura.

Career
After completing MBA, Acharya moved to Mumbai and started in an advertising agency as an account executive, but quit to pursue cartooning. He got his first break as a political cartoonist with Mumbai-based English tabloid Midday. He started working with Midday as a staff cartoonist in 2003 and contributed to daily cartoon column for nine years. He also draws cartoons for Gulf News.

Mail Today rejected Acharya's cartoon showing PM Modi under China’s grip and dropped the cartoonist. Satish Acharya alleged censorship by Mail Today, but Mail Today editor Dwaipayan Bose called Acharya's allegations baseless.

Acharya's cartoon on the Charlie Hebdo Massacre was regarded as the one of the most powerful cartoons on the tragedy by the foreign media and the cartoon was published in newspapers including The Wall Street Journal, The Times and The Guardian.

Books
Acharya has released five cartoon books, of which are Mein, Hum and AAP in English, Cartoonishta in Kannada and Negipuggi in Kundapra Kannada. His cricket-cartoon book Non-Striker was officially released on 31 January 2015 in Bengaluru.

His latest cartoon book, ‘Go Corona Go’ was released in 2021 and became one of the first cartoon books with the pandemic as a theme.

References

External links 

Living people
Indian cartoonists
Mangaloreans
Tulu people
Kannada people
People from Udupi district
1971 births